Patrick McMahon (6 December 1911 – 1 January 1987) was an Irish hurler. At club level he played for Kildimo and Ahane, winning several Limerick Senior Championship medals, and was full-forward on the Limerick senior hurling team that won the All-Ireland Championship in 1936 and 1940.

References

1911 births
1987 deaths
Kildimo hurlers
Ahane hurlers
Limerick inter-county hurlers
All-Ireland Senior Hurling Championship winners